Nordkinn Fotballklubb is a Norwegian association football club from Mehamn, Finnmark.

It was founded on 22 November 1992 as a merger of the football sections of the clubs IL Nordkyn from Kjøllefjord and Mehamn IL. The club colors are red.

The men's football team currently plays in the Third Division, the fourth tier of Norwegian football. Their current run stretches from 2009 to present; they previously had a run from 2001 to 2003.

External links
 Mehamn Gressbane - Nordic Stadiums
 Kjøllefjord Stadion - Nordic Stadiums

References

Football clubs in Norway
Association football clubs established in 1992
Sport in Finnmark
1992 establishments in Norway